Lake Habbaniyah ( Baḥīra al-Ḥabbāniya) is a lake located halfway between Ramadi and Fallujah near Al-Taqaddum (TQ) Air Base in Al Habbaniyah in Anbar Province, Iraq.

In the late 1930s and 1940s Lake Habbaniyah was used by Imperial Airways as a refueling point and hotel for flying boats flying from the United Kingdom to India.  Nearby on the banks of the Euphrates had already been established the Royal Air Force airbase of RAF Dhibban, later renamed RAF Habbaniya.

It was the scene of action during the Rashid Ali rebellion Anglo-Iraqi War when the RAF trainee aircrew and troops stationed there effectively saw off the besieging Iraqi troops and subsequent German aerial attacks.

See also
 123 Signals Unit RAF
 Al Taqaddum - TQ
 RAF Habbaniya
 Lake Tharthar
 Lake Milh
 Lake Qadisiyah
 Mosul Dam
 List of dams and reservoirs in Iraq
 Wildlife of Iraq

References

Al Anbar Governorate
Lakes of Iraq
Euphrates